Another Woman (Chinese: 234說愛你) is a 2015 Taiwanese romantic film. The film star Ariel Lin, Eric Qin, Janel Tsai, Peggy Tseng, Chou Heng-Yin and Jolin Chien. The film premiered in Taiwan on October 23, 2015.

Synopsis 
An aspiring actress, Jian Pei-xun (Ariel Lin) takes on a case given that requires her to assume a false identity. The job was for Pei-xun to trick Wang Dan Li's husband (Janel Tsai), Li Yao (Eric Qin) into taking her as his mistress so that she can get rid of his extramarital affair, but things escalate far more than she had originally planned when Pei-xun falls in love with the married man.

Cast 
Main Cast

Supporting Cast

Soundtrack

Reception 
The film has earned a total box office of US$240,000.

References 

2015 films
Taiwanese romantic drama films